Thomas J. Grady (born October 6, 1939, in Tonopah, Nevada) is an American politician and a Republican former member of the Nevada Assembly, serving from 2003 until 2014.

Education
Grady attended the University of Nevada, Reno and Washington State University.

Elections
2012 Grady was unopposed for both the June 12, 2012 Republican Primary and the November 6, 2012 General election, winning with 21,545 votes.
2002 When Democratic Assemblyman and former Speaker Joe Dini retired and left the District 38 seat open, Grady won the four-way September 3, 2002 Republican Primary with 2,349 votes (46.71%), and won the three-way November 5, 2002 General election with 8,210 votes (49.64%) against Democratic nominee George Dini and Independent American candidate Dennis Gomez.
2004 Grady was unopposed for the September 7, 2004 Republican Primary and won the three-way November 2, 2004 General election with 14,336 votes (60.05%) against Democratic nominee Cathylee James and Independent American candidate Dennis Gomez.
2006 Grady and James were both unopposed for their August 15, 2006 primaries, setting up a rematch; Grady won the November 7, 2006 General election with 12,899 votes (61.85%) against James.
2008 Grady was unopposed for the August 12, 2008 Republican Primary and won the three-way November 4, 2008 General election with 16,782 votes (60.52%) against Democratic nominee Steven Dalton and a third contest with Independent American candidate Dennis Gomez.
2010 Grady won the June 8, 2010 Republican Primary with 5,948 votes (71.25%), and won the three-way November 2, 2010 General election with 17,282 votes (75.09%) in a direct contest with Independent American candidate Dennis Gomez.

References

External links
Official page at the Nevada Legislature
Campaign site
 

1939 births
Living people
Republican Party members of the Nevada Assembly
People from Yerington, Nevada
People from Tonopah, Nevada
University of Nevada, Reno alumni
Washington State University alumni